Ryusei Sagusa (三枝龍生 Sagusa Ryusei) is a  Yoshinkan aikido master. He spent many years as an uchi-deshi of Yoshinkan founder Gozo Shioda.

Publications
体は何でも知っている (ちくま文庫) 2010.

External links
 Aikido Tenshinkai

1954 births
Living people
Japanese aikidoka
Date of birth missing (living people)
Place of birth missing (living people)